Brighton Rosie Sharbino (born August 19, 2002) is an American actress. She is best known for her role as Lizzie Samuels on the AMC television series The Walking Dead.

Early life
Sharbino is from Flower Mound, Texas. Her siblings Saxon and Sawyer Sharbino also act, and the family moved to Los Angeles when Brighton was nine. She switched to online school to make time for her acting career.

Career
Sharbino began her career singing on Barney & Friends on PBS. She had other early guest television appearances on series such as Hannah Montana, Prime Suspect, The New Normal and True Detective.

In 2013, Sharbino landed her first major recurring role as Lizzie Samuels in the fourth and fifth seasons of The Walking Dead. She appeared in the film Cheap Thrills and played Young Abby Sciuto in the "Hit and Run" episode of NCIS.

In 2014, Sharbino was cast in the fantasy series Once Upon a Time , in which she played the young version of the Snow Queen, Ingrid. About the role she stated "It was very different from shooting The Walking Dead and I loved it ‘cause I got to be a princess. In The Walking Dead they would put dirt on me. They put extensions on me, were fixing my hair, and let me wear a princess dress, it was really fun to do. It was a dream."

Sharbino played Abby Beam in the 2016 faith based film Miracles From Heaven, alongside Queen Latifah and Jennifer Garner. The movie was shot in Atlanta in the summer of 2015 and Sharbino had her 13th birthday on set.

In 2017, Sharbino played the role of Tiffany Hart in the film Bitch. That same year, she had a guest role as Mandy Fowler in an episode of Law and Order: Special Victims Unit; and appeared in Growing Up Smith, a coming of age comedy about growing up in small town USA in 1979 in which Sharbino played the role of Amy. The film won numerous best audience awards and jury awards at film festivals, including the Woodstock, Naples, CAAMFest and Prescott festivals.

In 2018, Sharbino acted alongside her older sister Saxon in the film Urban Country; she played the role of Faith, a teenager that moves to a horse ranch to help her ill mother.

In 2019, she starred as antagonist Allison Betts in season 1 of the Brat web series Zoe Valentine and appeared in the drama film American Skin. She starred in the 2020 Snap Original series Players.

Personal life 
Sharbino plays the piano and took parkour classes with her younger brother.

Filmography

Film

Television

Web

Music videos

Audio

References

External links

Living people
21st-century American actresses
Actresses from Texas
American child actresses
American film actresses
American radio actresses
American television actresses
American web series actresses
People from Flower Mound, Texas
2002 births